Sundara Pandian is a 1998 Indian  Tamil-language comedy film, directed and produced by R. Raghu, starring Karthik, Swathi and Heera Rajagopal.

Plot
Pandi (Karthik) is an uneducated villager who he's in love with his niece Karthika (Swathi) but she doesn't love him. Sundar (Also Karthik) is the son of a rich businessman and lives without his father's love in the city.

One day, Pandi decides to leave his village to earn money and find a wife. Meanwhile, Sundar comes to Pandi's village to swim at the river, and the villagers catch him. After seeing Pandi's mother, Sundar stays there and he gets the mother's affection.

Pandi doesn't find a job in the city, Sundar's father then brought Pandi with him and thought that his son became mad. There, Ramya (Heera Rajagopal), a police officer falls in love with Pandi. Meanwhile, Kottaval (Manivannan), Ashok Raj's enemy, escapes from the psychiatrist hospital to kill Ashok Raj and his son Sundar.

Karthika falls in love with Sundar and Karthika's father (Alex) prevents her to forget him. The enemy of Karthika's father decides to kill Karthika's father but Sundar saves him. Karthika's father apologizes to his elder sister and plans to marry his daughter to his saviour. Sundar reveals to Karthika his real identity.

Sundar leaves the village to find Pandi. Kottaval and his henchmen kidnap Ashok Raj and Pandi. Sundar saves them and sends Kottaval to jail.

Cast
Karthik as Pandi / Sundar
Swathi as Karthika
Heera Rajagopal as Ramya
Vadivelu as Pavadai
Manivannan as Kottaval
Alex as Karthika's father
Vasu Vikram as Vasu
Bharathi Vishnuvardhan as Pandi's mother
Gandhimathi
C. R. Saraswathi
Pasi Sathya
Senthamarai
Kumarimuthu
Junior Balaiah

Soundtrack 

The film score and the soundtrack were composed by Deva. The soundtrack, released in 1998, features 5 tracks with lyrics written by Kalidasan, Ponniyin Selvan and Vasan.

References

1998 films
Films scored by Deva (composer)
1990s Tamil-language films
Films directed by R. Raghu